Krysten Cottrell (née Duffill, born 17 January 1992) is a New Zealand rugby union player. She made her debut for New Zealand off the bench against Australia on 18 August 2018 at Sydney.

Biography 
In 2018 Cottrell was one of 28 Black Ferns who were offered contracts. She is a women’s rugby development officer for Hawke's Bay Rugby Union. She was selected for the Black Ferns November tour of 2018. She appeared in all three tests against the United States and France.

Cottrell was named in New Zealand's squad for the 2019 Women's Rugby Super Series in San Diego. She only featured in the match against Canada. She later played in both of the Black Ferns two-test match series against Australia in August.

On 3 November 2021, Cottrell was named in the Blues squad for the inaugural Super Rugby Aupiki competition. She was in the Blues starting line up for their first game, she converted a try against Matatū in their 21–10 victory. She also started in their 0–35 thrashing by the Chiefs Manawa in the final round.

References

External links 
 Black Ferns Profile

1992 births
Living people
New Zealand female rugby union players
New Zealand women's international rugby union players